Chase Evans Priskie (born March 19, 1996) is an American professional ice hockey defenseman for the San Diego Gulls of the American Hockey League (AHL) as a prospect for the Anaheim Ducks of the National Hockey League (NHL).

Priskie appeared in four NHL contests with the Florida Panthers. He is the first player exclusively born and raised in South Florida to play a game for the Panthers.

Playing career
Being born in March 1996, Priskie was original eligible to be drafted in the 2014 NHL Entry Draft, but was not chosen until two years later when he was selected near the end of the sixth round, 177th overall by the Washington Capitals, after playing his rookie season at Quinnipiac University with the Bobcats. In his rookie season, Priskie averaged top four minutes and finished third in points among team defenceman; he was ranked 126th overall according to NHL Central Scouting heading into the draft. He would play three more seasons with Quinnipiac, finishing over a point-per-game in his final season. During this time, he served as team captain from 2017 to 2019, when he graduated. In his final season, he was a finalist for the Hobey Baker Award and led all defenceman in the country in goals scored, but lost the prestigious award to Cale Makar.

After his final year of college, Priskie was not signed by the Capitals and became a free agent in August 2019. On August 17, Priskie and the Carolina Hurricanes agreed to terms on a two-year, entry-level contract. In his first professional season, Priskie did not make the Hurricanes roster and was assigned to Carolina's minor league affiliate, the Charlotte Checkers. He appeared in 52 games with the Checkers, recording 31 points. On February 24, 2020, the day of the NHL's trade deadline, Priskie was included in a package with Erik Haula, Eetu Luostarinen and Lucas Wallmark when he was traded to the Florida Panthers in exchange for Vincent Trocheck. He played the rest of the season in the AHL with Florida's affiliate, the Springfield Thunderbirds.

During the COVID-19 affected 2020–21 season, the Panthers and Tampa Bay Lightning shared an AHL team, the Syracuse Crunch, where Priskie appeared in 15 games. As a restricted free agent, Priskie was re-signed by the Panthers to a $750,000 one-year, two-way contract on August 5, 2021. The following season, the Checkers became Florida's affiliate, and Priskie began the season with them.  Priskie was called up to the Panthers three times by November 3, 2021, to serve as depth for Panthers defensive injuries, but did not appear in a game. He made his NHL debut the following night against the Capitals due to an injury to Radko Gudas, playing on the bottom defensive pair next to Kevin Connauton. He played 10:37 and recorded one shot on goal in a 5–4 overtime win. In his debut, Priskie became the first Florida player to suit up for the Panthers. His accomplishment was celebrated with several billboards in the Sunrise, Florida area. Priskie was returned to the AHL on November 7.

A free agent from the Panthers at the end of the season, Priskie continued his career by agreeing to a one-year contract with the Buffalo Sabres on July 13, 2022, the opening day of free agency.

On March 3, 2023, the Sabres traded Priskie to the Anaheim Ducks in exchange for Austin Strand.

Personal life
Priskie was born in Pembroke Pines, the only child to parents Jeff Priskie and Lisa Evans, and grew up a fan of the Florida Panthers, owning several pieces of merchandise. Priskie first attended a Panthers game when he was 27 days old on April 16, 1996. Jeff passed away in 2013. While at Quinnipac, he majored in finance with a minor in computer science, graduating early in 2018. He completed a Master of Business Administration in 2019, also from Quinnipac.

Career statistics

References

External links
 

1996 births
American ice hockey defensemen
Charlotte Checkers (2010–) players
Florida Panthers players
Ice hockey people from Florida
Living people
People from Pembroke Pines, Florida
Quinnipiac Bobcats men's ice hockey players
Rochester Americans players
San Diego Gulls (AHL) players
Springfield Thunderbirds players
Syracuse Crunch players
Washington Capitals draft picks
Jewish ice hockey players